The Arrow class comprised six second-class screw-driven vessels built as despatch vessels for the Royal Navy in 1854, mounting 6 guns. In 1856 they were redesignated as second-class gunvessels.

Construction

Design
The Crimean War sparked a sudden need for shallow-draught, manoeuvrable vessels for inshore work in the Baltic and the Black Sea. The Arrow class of six wooden-hulled screw steamers were built during 1854 to a design by the Surveyor’s Department.  Construction was undertaken at two commercial yards on the Thames, R & H Green at Blackwall Yard and C J Mare & Company, at Leamouth. Two further designs of Crimean War gunvessel were ordered during 1855, the Intrepid class and the Vigilant class, and in 1856 the six Arrow-class despatch vessels were re-classed as second-class gunvessels.

Propulsion
A two-cylinder horizontal single expansion steam engine provided  through a single screw.

Sail plan
All Arrow-class gunvessels were barque-rigged.

Armament
The Arrow class were provided with two 68-pounder Lancaster muzzle-loading rifles weighing  on pivot mounts, and four 32-pounder  guns.

Ships

Operational lives
Wrangler was sent to the Baltic on completion, and the others of the class to the Black Sea where they took part in the Crimean War.  The Lancaster guns were not entirely successful and the class had their armament reduced, being employed in their original designation as despatch vessels.

See also

References 

 

Gunboat classes
 
 Arrow